Magic is a 1917 Hungarian drama film directed by Alexander Korda and starring Victor Varconi, Magda Nagy and Antal Nyáray.

Plot

Cast 

 Victor Varconi  
 Magda Nagy   
 Antal Nyáray   
 Lucie Labass
 Sam Jones

Bibliography
 Kulik, Karol. Alexander Korda: The Man Who Could Work Miracles. Virgin Books, 1990.

External links

Hungarian silent films
Hungarian drama films
1910s Hungarian-language films
Films directed by Alexander Korda
Hungarian black-and-white films
1917 drama films
1917 Austro-Hungarian films
Silent drama films